The Yankton Sioux Tribe of South Dakota is a federally recognized tribe of Yankton Western Dakota people, located in South Dakota. Their Dakota name is Ihaƞktoƞwaƞ Dakota Oyate, meaning "People of the End Village" which comes from the period when the tribe lived at the end of Spirit Lake just north of Mille Lacs Lake. The CNWRR records state the name is alternately spelled with an "E" instead of an "I" or "Ehanktowan".

Historically, the tribe are known for being the protectors of the sacred Pipestone Quarry for the Oceti Sakowin (Dakota/Sioux).  Over time the tribe has been referred to as Nakota Sioux which some say is inaccurate and that the Yankton people are Western Sioux.  Elsewhere the Yankton people are referred to as Wiciyela Sioux, or middle Sioux.

The tribe maintains a free-ranging bison herd.

Lewis & Clark
According to local legend, when Meriwether Lewis learned that a male child had been born near the expedition's encampment in what is today southeastern South Dakota, he sent for the child and wrapped the new born baby boy in an American flag during the council at Calumet Bluff in late August 1804. Lewis declared the baby an American. This boy grew up to become a headman (chief) of the Ihanktonwan Dakota (Yankton Sioux), known as Struck By-the-Ree. However, the journals of the expedition make no mention of this incident.

In December 1862 Little Crow met for a month with the leaders of the Yankton and Yanktonai.  Chief Struck By-the-Ree refused to join the Mdewakanton and sent warriors to protect Fort Pierre when Little Crow talked of attacking it.  When Struck By-the-Ree learned that some of Sleepy eye's band and White Lodge's band had captives on Yankton land he paid their encampment a visit.  He offered to trade horse for each prisoner, 2 woman and 5 children, and was scoffed at.  The Chief informed his visitors they were on Yankton land and would be attacked if they refused his generosity.  He was given the prisoners.

Treaties and land cession
The first treaty the United States signed with the Yankton people took place at Portage des Sioux on July 18, 1815.  The second took place in Washington D.C. on October 21, 1837, and is recorded as Indian Treaty 226.  By the late 1850s, pressure to open up what is now southeastern South Dakota to white settlement had become very strong. Struck-by-the-Ree and several other headmen journeyed to Washington, D.C., in late 1857 to negotiate a treaty with the federal government.  The Sisseton and Wahpeton tribes signed the Treaty of Traverse des Sioux, ceding lands west to the Big Sioux River.  The Yankton Sioux claimed the land east of the Big Sioux River past the Pipestone quarry.  Both the Yankton and Yanktonai felt they Santee Sioux were collecting annuities that should have been theirs with the Yanktonai further claimed the Yankton tribe had sold Yanktonai land also.  For more than three and a half months the tribal leaders worked on the terms of a treaty of land cession. The Yankton Treaty of Washington was signed April 19, 1858 with article 8 granting the Yankton a one-mile square reservation protecting the pipestone quarry.  The treaty made Minnesota Territory free and clear to become a State in May 1858. Returning from Washington, Padaniapapi (Struck-by-The-Ree) told his people, "The white men are coming in like maggots. It is useless to resist them. They are many more than we are. We could not hope to stop them. Many of our brave warriors would be killed, our women and children left in sorrow, and still we would not stop them. We must accept it, get the best terms we can get and try to adopt their ways."  Despite having a treaty for the reservation at Pipestone white settlers over and over ignored it and even submitted land claims for some of it.  In the 1880s a ten-man cavalry troop from Fort Randall was sent to evict the squatters, but the problem continued and with little outside support, the Yankton people went to the U.S. Supreme Court in 1928 to protect their rights and land. A hundred acres of the reservation were taken for the construction of the Pipestone Indian school in 1894. Native American children were sent to the school until its closure in the 1950s. The Supreme Court ruled that when the Government took that land for the school it had actually taken the entire reservation and that the tribe should be compensated. At that point the Pipestone reservation was on its path to becoming a National Monument.

Specific provisions of the treaty called for educating the tribe to develop skills in agriculture, industrial arts and homemaking. This provided the purpose for construction of the school. The treaty stipulated that the tribe relocate to a  reservation on the north side of the Missouri River in what is now Charles Mix County, named for the commissioner who signed the 1858 treaty for the federal government.) The Senate ratified the treaty on February 16, 1859, and President James Buchanan authorized it ten days later. On July 10, 1859, the Yankton Sioux vacated the ceded lands and moved onto the newly created reservation. After then there are three cessions on record: cessions 410, 411, and 412, all reducing the size of the reservation.

In the 1990s a dispute between the tribe and the state led to the reservation's reduction to its current size. The state had issued a permit for a new landfill to be built on land the tribe argued was on the reservation, based on its original boundaries, and thus the landfill had to meet federal standards, which it did not. It sued the state in federal court to block the project. In its defense, the state pointed to an 1894 act of Congress that had modified the 1858 treaty in the wake of the Dawes Act seven years earlier accepting an agreement with the Yankton Sioux to sell to the federal government all the lands not allotted to members of the tribe. In 1998 the case reached the Supreme Court, which unanimously held for the state, finding no evidence that Congress had intended to retain the reservation boundaries in existence as of 1894.  In 2011, after years of litigation, the Supreme Court ruled in favor of the Yankton people by determining that "the Yankton Reservation had not been disestablished".

Government
The tribe's headquarters are in Wagner, South Dakota, and it is governed by a democratically elected non-Indian Reorganization Act tribal council. Its original constitution was ratified in 1891.

It is the only Dakota/Lakota tribe in South Dakota that did not agree to comply with the Indian Reorganization Act and retains its traditional government.

Officially, the Yankton Sioux Tribe is called "Ihanktonowan Dakota Oyate" in the local dialect. The Yankton Sioux, or Dakota people, adopted a unique tribal symbol on September 24, 1975. With minor alterations this symbol serves as seal, logo and flag.

Crossing the yellow portions of the flag approximately one-third from the bottom is an undulating red line. This symbolizes a "prayer" to bind the home in love and safety. Red was chosen by designer Gladys L. Moore, a Yankton Sioux from Union Lake (Ibid), Michigan, because it is a symbol of life. The color red was painted around the lower parts of tepees to indicate that those that visited would be fed or that that particular tepee was one of several in which a feast was to be held.

Reservation

The tribe's reservation is the Yankton Indian Reservation, established in 1853 in Charles Mix County, South Dakota. Most of the tribe moved onto the reservation in the 1860s.

The Yankton treaty of 1858 created a Yankton Sioux Reservation one mile square at the Pipestone quarry in Minnesota.  The Yankton people are credited with protecting the quarry from white settlement and the creation of the Pipestone National Monument that now exists where the reservation once was.

Economic development
The tribe owns and operates the Fort Randall Casino and Hotel in Pickstown, South Dakota, and Lucky Lounge and Four Directions Restaurant.

Other major employers include Indian Health Services, the tribe itself, Bureau of Indian Affairs, and Marty Indian School.

Archery
Archery reached an equital technology with the Yankton Sioux. Made from local materials, the tribe used bows and arrows to hunt deer, antelope and small game. Reportedly, the Yankton could kill a bison with each arrow in a quiver.

Bows
Another example of a Yankton bow was collected in 1869 and is kept by the Department of Anthropology at the National Archives. It is made from either ash or white oak and is sinew backed. The sinew is coated with a white, chalky material to prevent moisture from loosening the bands. There are remains of red pigment on the belly of the bow, and four red slashes are painted on the back of each limb. The bow is only 45.25 inches tip to tip, and with thick limbs is very strong.
The bowstring is two-ply sinew. "The sinew string is broken but well made and is permanently tied to the bottom limb with a slip knot.

Arrows
The Smithsonian has Yankton arrows also collected in 1869, that have metal arrowheads. The four arrows range from 23.75 inches (shortest) to 26.25 inches (longest). Unlike most Sioux arrows from the time and region, these were made from split hickory instead of shoots. With their iron broadhead arrowheads, the arrows could have deep penetration power with the thick hickory shafts. The feathers are two hawk feathers, and one turkey feather used as the cock feather. They are attached with animal glue and sinew string. Blue and green paint is evident underneather the feathers. The nocks are widely flared,

Quivers and case
A Sioux quiver and bow case was donated to the archives in 1892. It is brain tanned buckskin with beadwork at the top and bottom. There is fringe as well at the top and bottom, and they are sewn with sinew. The quiver is 26.5 inches long, and the bow case is 46 3/8 inches long.

Transportation system

YST Transit, short for Yankton Sioux Tribe Transit, and otherwise known as Ihanktowan Transit is the provider of mass transportation on the reservation. Nine scheduled bus services operate Monday through Friday between Marty, Ravinia, Wagner, the Fort Randall Casino and Lake Andes. There are a total of 17 stops, with three in Marty, one in Ravinia, seven in Wagner, one at the Fort Randall Casino and five in Lake Andes, while fares are set at $1. Demand-response service is also provided.

Fixed route ridership
The ridership and service statistics shown here are of fixed route services only and do not include demand response.

Notable tribal members

 Indigenous (band)
 Ella Cara Deloria (linguist, ethnologist)
Rev. Philip Joseph Deloria, (first Episcopal priest to his people)
 Jacqueline Keeler (writer, activist)
 Maria Pearson (activist, "Rosa Parks of NAGPRA")
 Paul Rouse Sr. (recognized Chief after Death)
 Jimmy Sanchez (Blackbelt Martial Artist/Motivational Speaker)
 Faith Spotted Eagle (elder, activist, and first Native American to receive an electoral vote for president)
 Struck by the Ree (Chief, Headman, Treaty Signer)
 Greg Zephier Sr.  (AIM Activist/Activist/Artist/Musician (Vanishing Americans Band)
 Zitkala-Sa (writer, editor, musician, teacher and political activist)
 Smutty Bear (Chief, Headman, Treaty Signer)
 Nathan Neuharth (author)

Gallery

Notes

References
 Pritzker, Barry M. A Native American Encyclopedia: History, Culture, and Peoples. Oxford: Oxford University Press, 2000.

External links

 Yankton Sioux Tribe of South Dakota, official website
 Yankton Sioux Reservation, Akta Lakota Museum and Cultural Center
YST Transit

Native American tribes in South Dakota
Yankton Dakota
Federally recognized tribes in the United States
Indigenous weapons of the Americas
Archery in the United States
Bus transportation in South Dakota